Madonna and Child with Saints is a 1515 oil on canvas painting, now in the Fogg Art Museum in Cambridge (Massachusetts). Previously attributed to Cima da Conegliano, it is now attributed to an artist in the circle of Giovanni Bellini. 

It shows its husband and wife donors at bottom centre (the husband possibly painted posthumously), with the accompanying saints in two groups of three - on the left Sebastian, Francis of Assisi and John the Baptist and on the right Jerome, an unidentified female saint and Anthony of Padua.

References

1515 paintings

Paintings in the Harvard Art Museums
Paintings of Saint Sebastian
Paintings of Jerome
Paintings of Anthony of Padua
Paintings of Francis of Assisi
Paintings depicting John the Baptist